Thorpe Waterville is a village in the English county of Northamptonshire. It is combined with Achurch  to form the ecclesiastical parish of 'Thorpe Achurch'; in turn this is added to another combined parish, Lilford-cum-Wigsthorpe, to form the grouped parish council of Lilford-cum-Wigsthorpe and Thorpe Achurch. This is part of North Northamptonshire.

Thorpe Waterville lies on the A605 road some three miles north-east of the town of Thrapston. Thorpe Waterville Castle, of which only a building used as a barn remains, was mainly the work of Walter de Langton, Bishop of Lichfield and Treasurer to King Edward I.

Chapel Cottage in the village, has a date stone carved into the right hand side of the ingle nook fireplace showing the year 1618. Reference to this date on the chimney, 1618, is made in R. Gough's 1806, Translation of Camden's Britannia with Additions, Northamptonshire p.283, "Robert Brown, founder of the sect of the Browniſts, ....., resided in a little thatched house in Thorpe Waterville which is still subsisting, with a date on the chimney 1618" . During its renovation in the late 1970s, following a thatch roof fire, builders discovered what was rumoured to be one end of a tunnel stretching from the Manor House to Chapel Cottage. The owners of the cottage were reluctant to excavate the tunnel entrance fully so the validity of this cannot be confirmed.

External links 

General details

Villages in Northamptonshire
North Northamptonshire